F. vulgaris may refer to:
 Filago vulgaris, a plant species
 Filipendula vulgaris, the dropwort, a plant species

See also
 Vulgaris (disambiguation)